Afrovenator ("African hunter") is a genus of megalosaurid theropod dinosaur from the Middle Jurassic Period of northern Africa.

Discovery and naming 

The remains of Afrovenator were discovered in 1993 in the Tiourarén Formation of the department of Agadez in Niger. The Tiourarén was originally thought to represent the Hauterivian to Barremian stages of the early Cretaceous Period, or approximately 132 to 125 million years ago (Sereno et al. 1994). However, re-interpretation of the sediments showed that they are probably Mid-Jurassic in age, dating Afrovenator to the Bathonian to Oxfordian stages, between 167 and 161 mya. The sauropod Jobaria, whose remains were first mentioned in the same paper which named Afrovenator, is also known from this formation.

Afrovenator is known from a single relatively complete skeleton, holotype UC OBA 1, featuring most of the skull minus its top (likewise the mandible, or lower jaws, are lacking apart from the prearticular bone), parts of the spinal column, partial forelimbs, a partial pelvis, and most of the hind limbs. This skeleton is housed at the University of Chicago.

The generic name comes from the Latin afer, "African", and venator, "hunter". There is one named species, Afrovenator abakensis. The generic name refers to its predatory nature, and its provenance from Africa. The specific name refers to Abaka, the Tuareg name for the region of Niger where the fossil was found. The original short description of both genus and species is found in a 1994 paper which appeared in the prestigious journal Science. The primary author was well-known American paleontologist Paul Sereno, with Jeffrey Wilson, Hans Larsson, Didier Dutheil, and Hans-Dieter Sues as coauthors.

Description 

Sereno stressed that the general build was gracile and that the forelimbs and the lower leg were relatively long: the humerus has length of forty centimetres and the tibia and fourth metatarsal measure 687 and 321 millimetres respectively, as compared to a thighbone length of seventy-six centimetres.

Several autapomorphies have been established, traits that distinguish Afrovenator from its nearest relatives. The depression in which the antorbital fenestra is located, has a front end in the form of a lobe. The third neck vertebra has a low rectangular spine. The crescent-shaped wrist bone is very flat. The first metacarpal has a broadly expanding contact surface with the second metacarpal. The foot of the pubic bone is notched from behind.

In general the skull is rather flat, its height being less than three times its length, which cannot be exactly determined because the praemaxillae are lacking. The maxilla, which has a long front branch, bears fourteen teeth, as can be deduced from the tooth sockets: the teeth themselves have been lost. There is a small maxillary fenestra, which does not reach the edge of the antorbital depression and is located behind a promaxillary fenestra. The lacrimal bone has a distinctive rounded horn on top. The lower branch of the postorbital bone is transversely wide. The jugal bone is short, deep and pneumatised.

Classification 

Most analyses place Afrovenator within the Megalosauridae, which was formerly a "wastebasket family" which contained many large and hard-to-classify theropods, but has since been redefined in a meaningful way, as a sister taxon to the family Spinosauridae within the Megalosauroidea.

A 2002 analysis, focused mainly on the noasaurids, found Afrovenator to be a basal megalosaurid. However, it did not include Dubreuillosaurus (formerly Poekilopleuron valesdunensis), which could affect the results in that region of the cladogram (Carrano et al. 2002).

Other more recent and more complete cladistic analyses show Afrovenator in a group of Megalosauridae with Eustreptospondylus and Dubreuillosaurus. This group is either called Megalosaurinae (Allain 2002) or Eustreptospondylinae (Holtz et al. 2004). The latter study also includes Piatnitzkysaurus in this taxon. A study by Matthew Carrano from 2012 placed Afrovenator in a megalosaurid Afrovenatorinae.

A few alternative hypotheses have been presented for Afrovenators relationships. In Sereno's original description, Afrovenator was found to be a basal spinosauroid (he at the time used the name "Torvosauroidea"), outside of Spinosauridae and Megalosauridae (which he called "Torvosauridae"). Finally, another recent study places Afrovenator outside of the Megalosauroidea completely, and instead finds it more closely related to Allosaurus (Rauhut 2003). This is the only study to draw this conclusion.

The phylogeny according to Carrano et al. (2012) is shown by this cladogram.

 References 

 Further reading 
 
 
 Holtz, T.R., Molnar, R.E., Currie, P.J. (2004). "Basal Tetanurae". In: Weishampel, D.B., Dodson, P., & Osmolska, H. (eds.). The Dinosauria (2nd edition). Berkeley: University of California Press. pp. 71–110.
 Rauhut, O.W.M. (2003). The Interrelationships and Evolution of Basal Theropod Dinosaurs. Special Papers in Palaeontology 69'. London: The Palaeontological Association. pp. 1–215.

Megalosaurs
Bathonian life
Oxfordian life
Middle Jurassic dinosaurs of Africa
Fossils of Niger
Mesozoic Niger
Fossil taxa described in 1994
Taxa named by Paul Sereno
Taxa named by Hans-Dieter Sues